Vrbovce may refer to: 

 Vrbovce, Slovakia, a village and municipality in Myjava District, Trenčín Region, north-western Slovakia
 Vrbovce, Slovenia, a settlement in the Šentjernej municipality, southeastern Slovenia